Dorset County Hospital is a district general hospital in the town of Dorchester, Dorset, England. The hospital is managed by Dorset County Hospital NHS Foundation Trust.

History

Plans were developed in the early 1980s for a modern facility to replace the old Dorchester Hospital at a new site to the west of the town centre, on the land between Damers Road and Bridport Road. Construction took place in phases with the first phase on the north part of the site completed in the late 1980s under the name of West Dorset County Hospital. The second phase on the south part of the site completed in the mid-1990s at which time the who site became the Dorset County Hospital. The hospital was officially opened by the Queen on 8 May 1998. An upgraded cardiac unit with new cardiology equipment opened in 2012.

See also
 Healthcare in Dorset
 List of hospitals in England

References

External links 

 
 Dorset County Hospital on the NHS website
 Inspection reports from the Care Quality Commission

NHS hospitals in England
Hospitals in Dorset
Buildings and structures in Dorchester, Dorset
Hospitals established in 1998
Health in Dorset